Calothamnus longissimus  is a plant in the myrtle family, Myrtaceae and is endemic to the south-west of Western Australia. It is a small, spreading shrub with unusually long, fine leaves and which produces clusters of red flowers in spring. (In 2014 Craven, Edwards and Cowley proposed that the species be renamed Melaleuca longissima.)

Description

The flowers are dark red and arranged in small spikes with the lower part of the flower embedded in the corky bark. The stamens are arranged in 4 claw-like bundles of unequal lengths - the upper two are longer and broader and the lower two lacking anthers. Flowering occurs in August to October and is followed by fruits which are woody capsules almost immersed in the corky bark.

Taxonomy and naming
Calothamnus longissimus was first formally described by Victorian Government Botanist Ferdinand von Mueller in 1862 in the third volume (part 21) of Fragmenta Phytographiae Australiae. The specific epithet (longissimus) is a Latin word meaning "longest".

Distribution and habitat
Calothamnus longissimus is found in the Avon Wheatbelt, Geraldton Sandplains and Swan Coastal Plain biogeographic regions where it grows in kwongan.

Conservation
Calothamnus longissimus is classified as "not threatened" by the Western Australian government department of parks and wildlife.

References

longissimus
Myrtales of Australia
Plants described in 1862
Endemic flora of Western Australia
Taxa named by Ferdinand von Mueller